William Masters (1915–2001) was an American gynecologist, of the Masters and Johnson sexuality research team.

William Masters may refer to:
 
 William Masters (rugby union) (1858–1897), Scottish rugby union player
 William Masters (politician) (1820–1906), American farmer, pioneer, and politician in Wisconsin
 William Masters (botanist) (1796–1874), English nurseryman, garden designer, and amateur botanist
 Gordon Stretton (1887–1983), born William Masters, English and Argentine musician
 William Masters (engineer)
William A. Masters (economist)

See also
 Billy Masters (disambiguation)